Aliocis is a genus of tree-fungus beetle in the family Ciidae. It was described by Sandoval-Gómez and Lopes-Andrade in 2015, as a replacement name for the genus Anoplocis, preoccupied by a genus of true weevils.

Species
 Aliocis poriae (Nakane & Nobuchi, 1955)
 Aliocis ryukyuensis Kawanabe, 1996

References

Ciidae genera